HMS Taiaroa was a colonial service  designed by Thornycroft & Company for the defence of New Zealand.  She was named after Te Matenga Taiaroa, a 19th-century Māori chief of the Ngāi Tahu iwi.  She was built at Chiswick in 1883 and shipped to New Zealand, where she was assigned to the defence of Port Chalmers.

Service
On 1 February 1884 Defender and Taiaroa were shipped aboard the sailing ship Lyttelton from London to  Port Chalmers, New Zealand. Taiaroa was sent to Deborah Bay, at Port Chalmers (port of the city of Dunedin), where a boat house was established for her.

She received a pair of 18-inch Whitehead torpedoes that had been fitted at build to her two sisters, Waitemata and Poneke.  These had to be dropped together to avoid unbalancing the boat's narrow hull.  All four boats of the class quickly became obsolete, and before 1900 had fallen out of use.

Fate
After falling into disuse, she is believed to have been broken up. The mole built for the use of Taiaroa is now used as a pull-off carpark on the harbour road.

References

Sources
The New Zealand Maritime Index

 

Defender-class torpedo boats
Ships built in Chiswick
1883 ships
Port Chalmers
Ships built by John I. Thornycroft & Company